Zita Sattar (born 1975) is an English television, theatre, and film actress from Birmingham.

Early life
Sattar is of mixed descent, her mother being British and her father Pakistani. At the age of eleven, as a young amateur actress, Sattar was one of the founding members of Birmingham's Central Junior Television Workshop. She then attended the Rose Bruford College of Theatre & Performance in London.

Career
Sattar is best known for playing Anna Paul in Casualty from 2001 to 2003. She has also had roles in The Bill, Gimme Gimme Gimme, According to Bex, Dalziel and Pascoe, Doctors, and Flowers.

Her theatre roles include: Top Girls, Clubbed Out, Let's Go to the Fair, Hansel and Gretel, One Night, D'yer Eat with your Fingers, and Romeo and Juliet. She also played the role of Meenah Khan in the original cast of East is East by Ayub Khan-Din. It was produced by the Tamasha Theatre Company at the Royal Court Theatre, London, in 1996. Although she did not reprise the role in the film version of the play (1999), she did appear as new character Neelam Haqq in the sequel West Is West (2010).
She has starred in the following low-budget films: The Final Curtain, Esther Kahn, Janice Beard 45wpm, and Large.

Personal life
Sattar currently lives in Bristol. Her partner is director Declan O'Dwyer, with whom she has one daughter, Lola.

Filmography

Film

Television

References

External links

1975 births
Living people
English people of Pakistani descent
English stage actresses
People from Birmingham, West Midlands
Alumni of Rose Bruford College
English television actresses